Lost Alone may refer to:

 LostAlone, a British rock band
 Lost Alone (album), a 2004 album by mind.in.a.box